Revolution II may refer to:

New England Revolution II, an American professional soccer club based in the Greater Boston area
Warner Revolution II, an American homebuilt aircraft